Fuera de Este Mundo is a 1996 album by Franco De Vita released on the Sony label. The CD's title song was a hit on the Billboard Latin music charts.

Tracks
1.  Esperando el sol
2.  Fuera de este mundo
3.  Si quieres decir adiós
4.  Tocando el cielo
5.  Golpeando en el mismo Lugar
6.  Contra vientos y mareas
7.  Barco a la deriva
8.  Empezando  olvidar
9.  Como cada domingo
10. Por amor al arte
11. Tocando el cielo (acústica)

1996 albums
Franco De Vita albums